Events from the year 1595 in Sweden

Incumbents
 Monarch – Sigismund

Events

 8 May - The Russo-Swedish War (1590–95) is terminated by the Treaty of Teusina with a victory and territorial gain for Sweden.
 - The Riksdag of Söderköping elects Duke Charles Regent (though not monarch) and bans the Catholic mass. 
 - The last remaining Catholic convent in Sweden, the Vadstena Abbey, is dissolved and the nuns leave for Poland. 
 - The Uppsala University, revived two years prior, is granted is official letter of privilege.

Births

 1 May - Lars Kagg, officer   (died 1661) 
 Władysław IV Vasa, prince   (died 1648) 
 Ebba Leijonhufvud, courtier and foster mother of queen Christina   (died 1654)
 Ebba Ryning, court official (died 1642)

Deaths

 26 June - Magnus, Duke of Östergötland, prince   (born 1542) 
 - Henrikki Laavunpoika of Kankainen, army commander  (born 1512)

References

 
Years of the 16th century in Sweden
Sweden